The 1994 Coppa Italia Final decided the winner of the 1993–94 Coppa Italia. It was held on 6 and 20 April 1994 between Sampdoria and Ancona.
Sampdoria won 6–1 on aggregate.

First leg

Second leg

References
https://www.rsssf.org/tablesi/italcuphistfull.html

Coppa Italia Finals
Coppa Italia Final 1994
Coppa Italia Final 1994